In the Israeli legal system, the Labor Courts system is a system of courts established under the Law of the Labor Court, 1969. This court system is the appellate judiciary specializing in Israeli labor law and social security (National Insurance, Health Insurance etc.).

Structure
Labor courts exist in two instances:
 Regional Labor Court: There are five regional courts, each situated in one of the following judicial districts: Tel Aviv, Jerusalem, Haifa, Beersheba and Nazareth. 
 National Labor Court: Situated in Jerusalem, this is an appellate court hearing appeals from judgments of regional courts. Certain issues, of particular importance (e.g. collective disagreements at national level), are heard in the national court as a first instance court.

The National Labor Court is considered the high authority in the field of labor law, and as such, is often excluded from the intervention of the Israeli Supreme Court. In some cases, however, the Israeli Supreme Court may agree to entertain an appeal. A legal dispute which existed between the then-President of the National Labor Court, Menahem Goldberg and the chief justice of the Supreme Court, Aharon Barak, the relations between the Labor Court to High Court. Goldberg and his predecessor Bar - Niv, ruled for the supremacy of the National Labor Court on the issues. Barak, however, allowed the petitions to the Supreme Court against a ruling by the National Labor Court.

List of National Labor Court Justices
 Zvi Bar-Niv – 1969–1986
 Menachem Goldberg – 1986–1997
 Steve Adler – 1997–2010
 Nili Arad – 2010–2013
 Yigal Plitman - 2013-2018
 Varda Wirth Livne - 2018-present

External links
 Website
Labor in Israel
Labour courts
Israeli courts
Israeli labour law
1969 establishments in Israel
Courts and tribunals established in 1969